is a 2016 anime television series based on Kentaro Miura's manga series of the same name and an acting sequel to the Golden Age Arc film trilogy. This is the second television series adaptation of the manga after the 1997 anime of the same name, covering the Conviction arc from the manga. A second season, covering the first half of the Hawk of the Millennium Empire arc aired in 2017.

Plot
The story follows Guts as the "Black Swordsman", an appearance which was briefly seen in the first episode of the 1997 television series as well as in the final scene of the Golden Age Arc films.

Only Guts and his lover Casca, who lost her sanity and memory from the horrors she saw and endured, escaped the "Eclipse" ritual. However, they were branded with marks that attract evil, restless spirits and other similar entities. With Casca in the care of blacksmith Godo and his adopted daughter Erica as well as Rickert, the only member of the Hawks absent during the Eclipse, Guts set off to hunt down the God Hand's Apostles to find and kill Griffith in a quest for vengeance. Years have passed, and Guts is joined in his hunt by an elf named Puck as events the God Hand has long waited for are beginning to unfold.

Episodes

Voice cast

Production
A new Berserk anime was announced in December 2015 in Hakusensha's Young Animal magazine, with a short preview trailer released at Comiket later the same month.  The anime's website announced in February 2016 that the project would be a television series.  A second trailer was streamed in March 2016.  A teaser video was streamed on the series' website in early June 2016. At the conclusion of the first season's final episode, a teaser confirmed a second season for April 2017.  The brief clip showed off the character Schierke and the Berserker armor, indicating the second season would adapt the next arc, "Hawk of the Millennium Empire".

Kentaro Miura, the author of the original manga, served as executive supervisor for the anime.  The series is directed by Shin Itagaki, and written by Makoto Fukami and Takashi Yamashita, with character designs provided by Hisashi Abe.  Animation studio Liden Films is producing the series with GEMBA and Millepensee helming on the animation production.  Shirō Sagisu returns from the Berserk: The Golden Age Arc films to compose the music for the series, while Susumu Hirasawa, composer for the 1997 series and the Golden Age Arc films, returns to produce two songs for the series, titled  and "Ash Crow". For first season, the opening theme song, "Inferno", is performed by 9mm Parabellum Bullet, while the ending theme, is performed by Nagi Yanagi. For second season, the opening theme song, "Sacrifice", performed by 9mm Parabellum Bullet, while the ending theme, performed by Yoshino Nanjō featuring Nagi Yanagi.

The primary voice cast is reprising their roles from the Golden Age Arc film trilogy, while voice actor Unshō Ishizuka is reprising his role as the Narrator from the original anime.

Producer Reo Kurosu has described the show's animation style as "a hybrid between 2D and 3D", elaborating that "For this series, we’re trying to do something new. The director is a 2D animator so what goes on in his mind and what he puts on the storyboard is all in 2D. From there it’s all about choosing which tool to use between full CG animation, traditional 2D, or a hybrid of the two. The director and the 2D and 3D studios will meet and discuss what to use depending on what we’re trying to accomplish with each scene." The 3D characters and objects are rendered with Cel shading to make them look more like 2D animation. A particular feature is that the shadows on 3D objects contain a linear hatching effect that simulates shading with a pen or pencil, and the same hatching effect is applied to the shadows that appear on any 2D models to create a more uniform look.

Broadcast and release
The first 12-episode season premiered on 1 July 2016 on Wowow, and later on MBS's Animeism programming block, TBS, CBC, and BS-TBS. The second season of the series began airing on April 7, 2017, with an hour-long two episode premiere.

The series is being simulcast on Crunchyroll. Crunchyroll announced at the annual Anime Expo on 1 July 2016 that the company will be releasing the series with an English dub on Blu-ray and DVD. The exact date that the series will be released has not been announced.

On March 17, 2017, IGN released a clip of the Berserk English dub and was announced that the series would be distributed by Funimation, but the series was dubbed by Bang Zoom! Entertainment. This marks the first time NYAV Post had no involvement in dubbing Berserk media since Sword of the Berserk. The first season was available on March 20 by Funimation.

Reception
IGN contributor Meghan Sullivan gave the opening episode a score of 8.5 out of a possible 10. In the review Sullivan praised the episodes' direction, stating "despite the somewhat distracting visuals, 'The Branded Swordsman' gets Guts' quest for vengeance off to a strong start".

Writer Cecilia D'Anastasio applauded the opening episode in a review published by Kotaku, going so far as to state that it "already outshines the 90's original". Though, noting the series' sub-par animation quality, D'Anastasio concluded, "Berserk is not for the faint-hearted. But 'The Branded Swordsman' proved to me that directors of fighting-heavy anime are making more of an effort to beautify and civilize the genre, doing justice to manga that showcases writing and ingenuity."

Anime News Network contributor Jacob Hope Chapman was critical of the show's production quality in his review of episodes 1–3, stating that "Berserk 2016 is an abominably ugly and almost forcefully unpleasant realization of our dreams, with cut-rate CGI, questionable music choices, and disorienting camera work". However, to him, the strength of the source work helps to carry the show, and Itagaki's frenetic directing style at least keeps the action interesting: "Once you manage to unclench your teeth at all those garish cel-shaded puppet bodies smacking against each other, Miura's compelling story and the captivating world still shine as one-of-a-kind flights of dark images with poignant characterization, even as they struggle under such a lackluster production."

References

External links
  
 

 
2016 anime television series debuts
Japanese adult animated fantasy television series
Japanese computer-animated television series
Anime composed by Shirō Sagisu
Anime series based on manga
Animeism
Crunchyroll anime
Dark fantasy anime and manga
Funimation
GEMBA (studio)
NBCUniversal Entertainment Japan
Anime and manga about revenge
Wowow original programming